The Republic of Letters (Respublica literaria) is the long-distance  intellectual community in the late 17th and 18th centuries in Europe and the Americas. It fostered communication among the intellectuals of the Age of Enlightenment, or philosophes as they were called in France.  The Republic of Letters emerged in the 17th century as a self-proclaimed community of scholars and literary figures that stretched across national boundaries but respected differences in language and culture.  These communities that transcended national boundaries formed the basis of a metaphysical Republic.  Because of societal constraints on women, the Republic of Letters consisted mostly of men. As such, many scholars use "Republic of Letters" and "men of letters" interchangeably.

The circulation of handwritten letters was necessary for its function because it enabled intellectuals to correspond with each other from great distances. All citizens of the 17th-century Republic of Letters corresponded by letter, exchanged published papers and pamphlets, and considered it their duty to bring others into the Republic through the expansion of correspondence.

The first known occurrence of the term in its Latin form (Respublica literaria) is in a letter by Francesco Barbaro to Poggio Bracciolini dated July 6, 1417; it was used increasingly in the 16th and 17th, so that by the end of that century it featured in the titles of several important journals.  Currently, the consensus is that Pierre Bayle first translated the term in his journal Nouvelles de la République des Lettres in 1684.  But there are some historians who disagree and some have gone so far as to say that its origin dates back to Plato's Republic.  Part of the difficulty in determining its origin is that, unlike an academy or literary society, it existed only in the minds of its members.

Historians are presently debating the importance of the Republic of Letters in influencing the Enlightenment. Today, most Anglo-American historians, whatever their point of entry to debate, occupy a common ground: the Republic of Letters and the Enlightenment were distinct.

Academies

The mid-17th century had seen the community of the curious take its first tentative steps towards institutionalization with the establishment of permanent literary and scientific academies in Paris and London under royal patronage. The foundation of the Royal Society in 1662, with its open door, was particularly important in legitimizing the Republic of Letters in England and providing a European center of gravity for the movement. The Royal Society primarily promoted science, which was undertaken by gentlemen of means acting independently. The Royal Society created its charters and established a system of governance. Its most famous leader was Isaac Newton, president from 1703 until his death in 1727. Other notable members include diarist John Evelyn, writer Thomas Sprat, and scientist Robert Hooke, the Society's first curator of experiments.  It played an international role to adjudicate scientific findings, and published the journal "Philosophical Transactions" edited by Henry Oldenburg.

The seventeenth century saw new academies open in France, Germany,  and elsewhere.  By 1700 they were found in most major cultural centers. They helped local members contact like-minded intellectuals elsewhere in the Republic of Letters and thus become cosmopolitans.  In Paris specialization was taken to new heights where, in addition to existing Académie Française and the Académie des Sciences founded in 1635 and 1666, there were three further royal foundations in the 18th century: the Académie des Inscriptions et Belles-Lettres (1701), the Académie de Chirurgie (1730), and the Société de Médecine (1776).

By the second half of the 18th century universities abandoned Aristotelian natural philosophy and Galenist medicine in favor of the mechanist and vitalist ideas of the moderns, so they placed a greater emphasis on learning by seeing. Everywhere in teaching science and medicine the monotonous diet of dictated lectures was supplemented and sometimes totally replaced by practical courses in experimental physics, astronomy, chemistry, anatomy, botany, materia medica, even geology and natural history.  The new emphasis on practical learning meant that the university now offered a much more welcoming environment to the Republic of Letters. Although most professors and teachers were still uninterested in membership, the ideological and pedagogical changes across the century created the conditions in which the pursuit of curiosity in the university world became much more possible and even attractive.

Institutions – academies, journals, literary societies – took over some of the roles, duties, and activities of scholarship.  Communication, for example, did not have to be from individual to individual; it could take place between academies, and pass thence to scholars, or be encapsulated in literary journals, to be diffused among the whole scholarly community. Literary agents, working for libraries but sharing the values of the learned community, demonstrate this professionalization on the most fundamental level.

Salons

The salonnière played a prominent role in establishing order within the Republic of Letters during the Enlightenment period. Beginning in the 17th century, salons served to bring together nobles and intellectuals in an atmosphere of civility and fair play in order to educate one, refine the other, and create a common medium of cultural exchange based on the shared notion of honnêteté that combined learning, good manners, and conversational skill.  But government was needed because, while the Republic of Letters was structured in theory by egalitarian principles of reciprocity and exchange, the reality of intellectual practice fell far short of this ideal. French men of letters in particular found themselves increasingly engaged in divisive quarrels rather than in constructive debate.  With the establishment of Paris as the capital of the Republic, French men of letters had enriched traditional epistolary relations with direct verbal ones. That is, finding themselves drawn together by the capital, they began to meet together and make their collaboration on the project of Enlightenment direct, and thus suffered the consequences of giving up the mediation that the written word provided. Without this traditional kind of formal mediation, the philosophes needed a new kind of governance.

The Parisian salon gave the Republic of Letters source of political order in the person of the salonnière, for she gave order both to social relations among salon guests and to the discourse in which they engaged. When Marie-Thérèse Geoffrin launched her weekly dinners in 1749, the Enlightenment Republic of Letters found its ‘center of unity’. As a regular and regulated formal gathering hosted by a woman in her own home, the Parisian salon could serve as an independent forum and locus of intellectual activity for a well-governed Republic of Letters. From 1765 until 1776, men of letters and those who wanted to be counted among the citizens of their Republic could meet in Parisian salons any day of the week.

The salons were literary institutions that relied on a new ethic of polite sociability based on hospitality, distinction, and the entertainment of the elite. The salons were open to intellectuals, who used them to find protectors and sponsors and to fashion themselves as 'hommes du monde.' In the salons after 1770 there emerged a radical critique of worldliness, inspired by Rousseau. These radicals denounced the mechanisms of polite sociability and called for a new model of the independent writer, who would address the public and the nation.

Lilti (2005) argues that the salon never provided an egalitarian space. Rather, salons only provided a form of sociability where politeness and congeniality of aristocrats maintained a fiction of equality that never dissolved differences in status but nonetheless made them bearable.  The "grands" (high-ranking nobles) only played the game of mutual esteem as long as they kept the upper hand. Men of letters were well aware of this rule, never confusing the politeness of the salons with equality in conversation.

As well, the advantages that writers gained from visiting salons extended to the protection by their hosts.  The salons provided crucial support in the career of an author, not because they were literary institutions, but, on the contrary, because they allowed men of letters to emerge from the circles of the Republic of Letters and access the resources of aristocratic and royal patronage.  As a result, instead of an opposition between the court and the Republic of Letters they are instead a collection of spaces and resources focused around the court as a center of power and distribution of favors.

Antoine Lilti paints a picture of a reciprocal relationship between men of letters and salonnières. Salonnières attracted the finest men of letters through gift-giving or regular allowance in order to boost the reputation of the salons.  For salon hosts and hostesses, they were not merely sources of information, but also important points of relay in the circulation of praise. From one salon to the next, in conversation as in correspondence, men of letters gladly praised the social groups who welcomed them.  In turn, the salon hostess had to be able to prove their capacity to mobilize as many high society contacts as possible in favor of their protégés. Consequently, correspondences openly display network of influence, and the woman of high society employed all their know-how to help benefit those men of letters whose elections to the academies they supported.

American salons
Mixed intellectual company was also found in 18th-century Philadelphia for those who sought it, sometimes in social gatherings modeled upon the salons of London and Paris. Where mixed social intercourse of a literary nature was concerned, Americans were virtuously and patriotically inclined to be wary of European examples. Conscious of the relative purity as well as the provinciality of their society, Americans did not seek to replicate what they perceived as the decadent societies of London and Paris. Nevertheless, to facilitate social intercourse of a literary nature where women were involved, Americans, led by certain strong-minded women, did draw upon and domesticate two models of such mixed intellectual company, one French and the other English.

In America intellectually motivated women consciously emulated these two European models of sociability: the ever fashionable French model of mistress of the salon, drawing upon feminine social adroitness in arranging meetings of minds, chiefly male, and the ever unfashionable English bluestocking model of no-nonsense, cultivated discourse, chiefly among women. Outside literary salons and clubs, society at large was mixed by nature, as were the families that constituted it. And whether or not men of letters chose to include femme savants in the Literary Republic, literary women shared such sociability as society at large afforded. This varied widely in America from one locality to one another.

Printing press

Very soon after the introduction of printing with moveable type, the Republic of Letters became closely identified with the press.  The printing press also played a prominent role in the establishment of a community of scientists who could easily communicate their discoveries through the establishment of widely disseminated journals. Because of the printing press, authorship became more meaningful and profitable. The main reason was that it provided correspondence between the author and the person who owned the printing presses – the publisher. This correspondence allowed the author to have a greater control of its production and distribution. The channels opened up by the great publishing houses provided a gradual movement towards an international Respublica with set channels of communication and particular points of focus (e.g. university towns and publishing houses), or simply the home of a respected figure.

Journals

Many learned periodicals began as imitations or rivals of publications originating after the mid-17th century. It is generally acknowledged that the Journal des Sçavans, a French journal started in 1665, is the father of all journals.  The first of the Dutch-based ones, and also the first of the genuinely "critical" journals, the Nouvelles de la République des Lettres, edited by Pierre Bayle, appeared in March 1684, followed in 1686 by the Bibliothèque Universelle of Jean Le Clerc. While French and Latin predominated, there was also soon a demand for book news and reviews in German and Dutch.

Journals did represent a new and different way of conducting business in the Republic of Letters. Like the printed book before them, journals intensified and multiplied the circulation of information; and since they consisted largely of book reviews (known as extraits), they enormously increased scholars’ potential knowledge about what was going on in their own community.  In the beginning, the audience and authorship of literary journals was largely the Republic of Letters itself.

The evolution of a true periodical press was slow, but once this principle was established it was only a matter of time before printers would perceive that the public was also interested in the world of scholarship.  As readership increased, it was clear that the tone, language, and content of journals implied that journalists defined their audience under a new form of Republic of Letters: either those who took an active role by writing and instructing others, or those who contented themselves with reading books and following the debates in the journals.  Formerly the domain of "les savants" and "érudits," the Republic of Letters now became the province of "les curieux."

The ideals of the Republic of Letters as a community thus come out in journals, both in their own statements of purpose in prefaces and introductions, and in their actual contents. Just as one goal of a commerce de lettres was to inform two people, the goal of the journal was to inform many.  In acting out this public role in the Republic of Letters, journals became a personification of the group as a whole. Attitudes of both journalists and readers suggest that a literary journal was regarded as in some sense an ideal member of the Republic of Letters.

It is also important to note that there has been some disagreements with Goldgar's sense of the importance of journals in the Republic of Letters.  Françoise Waquet has argued that literary journals did not in fact replace the commerce de lettres. Journals depended on letters for their own information. Moreover, the periodical press often failed to satisfy the scholarly desire for news. Its publication and sale were often too slow to satisfy readers, and its discussions of books and news could seem incomplete for such reasons, as specialization, religious bias, or simple distortion. Letters clearly remained desirable and useful. Yet it is certain that, from the time journals became a central feature of the Republic of Letters, many readers gained their news primarily from that source.

Transatlantic Republic of Letters

Historians have long understood that the English and French periodicals had a strong influence on colonial American letters.  During this period, the variety of institutions used for transmitting ideas did not exist in America. Aside from the largely arbitrarily assembled booksellers' stocks, an occasional overseas correspondence, and the publisher's or printer's advertisements to be found in the back of the books, the only way colonial intellectuals could keep alive their philosophical interests was through the reporting in periodical literature.

Examples include Benjamin Franklin, who cultivated his perspicuous style in imitation of the Spectator. Jonathan Edwards's manuscript Catalogue of reading reveals that he not only knew the Spectator before 1720 but was so enamored of Richard Steele that he tried to get his hands on everything: the Guardian, the Englishman, the Reader, and more. At Harvard College in 1721 a weekly periodical entitled the Telltale was inaugurated by a group of students, including Ebenezer Pemberton, Charles Chauncy, and Isaac Greenwood. As the Telltale's subtitle – "Criticisms on the Conversation and Behaviours of Scholars to promote right reasoning and good manners" – made explicit, it was a direct imitation of the English genteel periodical.

One of the best examples of a transatlantic Republic of Letters began about 1690, when John Dunton launched a series of journalistic ventures, nearly all of them under the aegis of a forward-looking "club" called the Athenian Society, an English predecessor of Harvard's Telltale Club, Franklin's Junto, and other such associations dedicated to mental and moral improvement. The Athenian society took it as one of their particular goals to spread learning in the vernacular.  One of the plans of this group in 1691 was the publication of translations from the Acta Eruditorum, the Journal des Sçavans, the Bibliothèque Universelle, and the Giornale de Letterati.  The outcome was the formation of The Young Students Library, containing Extracts and Abridgements of the Most Valuable Books Printed in England and in the Foreign Journals from the year Sixty-Five to the Present Time.  The Young Students Library, like the Universal Historical Bibliothèque of 1687, was made up almost entirely of translated pieces, in this case mostly from the Journal des Sçavans, Bayle's Nouvelles de la République des Lettres, and Le Clerc's and La Crose's Bibliothèque Universelle et Historique.

The Young Students Library of 1692 was exemplary of the kind of material to be found in later forms of the learned periodical in England. Expressly lamenting the absence in England of periodicals, the Young Students Library was designed to fill the need in America for periodical literature.

For Americans it served, according to David D Hall, as:

Historiographical debates
Anglo-American historians have turned their attention to the Enlightenment's dissemination and promotion, inquiring into the mechanisms by which it played a role in the collapse of the Ancien Régime.  This attention to the mechanisms of dissemination and promotion has led historians to debate the importance of the Republic of Letters during the Enlightenment.

Enlightenment as a rhetoric
In 1994, Dena Goodman published The Republic of Letters: A Cultural History of the French Enlightenment. In this feminist work, she described the Enlightenment not as a set of ideas but as a rhetoric. For her, it was essentially an open-minded discourse of discovery where like-minded intellectuals adopted a traditionally feminine mode of discussion to explore the great problems of life.  Enlightenment discourse was purposeful gossip and indissolubly connected with the Parisian salons.  Goodman questions as well the degree to which the public sphere is necessarily masculine. Under the influence of Habermas's Structural Transformation of the Public Sphere, she proposes an alternative division that defines women as belonging to an authentic public sphere of government critique through salons, Masonic lodges, academies, and the press.

Like the French monarchy, the Republic of Letters is a modern phenomenon with an ancient history. References to the Respublica literaria have been found as early as 1417. Nevertheless, the concept of the Republic of Letters emerged only in the early 17th century, and became widespread only at the end of that century.  Paul Dibon, cited by Goodman, defines the Republic of Letters as it was conceived in the 17th-century as:

According to Goodman, by the 18th century, the Republic of Letters was composed of French men and women, philosophes and salonnières, who worked together to attain the ends of philosophy, broadly conceived as the project of Enlightenment.  In her opinion, the central discursive practices of the Enlightenment Republic of Letters were polite conversation and letter writing, and its defining social institution was the Parisian salon.

Goodman argues that, by the middle of the 18th-century, French men of letters used discourses of sociability to argue that France was the most civilized nation in the world because it was the most sociable and most polite.  French men of letters saw themselves as the leaders of a project of Enlightenment that was both cultural and moral, if not political. By representing French culture as the leading edge of civilization, they identified the cause of humanity with their own national causes and saw themselves as at the same time French patriots and upstanding citizens of a cosmopolitan Republic of Letters. Voltaire, both a zealous champion of French culture and the leading citizen of the Enlightenment Republic of Letters, contributed more than anyone else to this self-representation of national identity.

Over the course of the 17th and 18th centuries the growth of the Republic of Letters paralleled that of the French monarchy. This history of the Republic of Letters is interwoven with that of the monarchy from its consolidation after the Wars of Religion until its downfall in the French Revolution. Dena Goodman finds this to be very important because this provides a history of the Republic of Letters, from its founding in the 17th century as an apolitical community of discourse through its transformation in the 18th century into a very political community whose project of Enlightenment challenged the monarchy from a new public space carved out of French society.

Engendering the Republic of Letters
In 2003, Susan Dalton published Engendering the Republic of Letters: Reconnecting Public and Private Spheres. Dalton supports Dena Goodman's view that women played a role in the Enlightenment. On the other hand, Dalton does not agree with Goodman for using Habermas's idea of the public and private spheres. While the public sphere has the capacity to include women, it is not the best tool for mapping the full range of political and intellectual action open to them because it provides an overly restrictive definition of what is properly political and/or historically relevant. In fact, this is the wider problem with relying on any public/private division: it shapes and even limits the vision of women's political and intellectual action by defining it in relation to specific venues and institutions because these are identified as the arenas of power and, ultimately, historical agency.

To study in a wider form of Republic of Letters, Dalton analyzed the correspondence of salon women to display the link between intellectual institutions and the various types of sociability. In particular, she examined the correspondence of two French and two Venetian salon women at the end of the 18th century in order to understand their role in the Republic of Letters. These women were Julie de Lespinasse (1732–76), Marie-Jeanne Roland (1754–93), Giustina Renier Michiel (1755–1832) and Elisabetta Mosconi Contarini (1751–1807).

To engage in literary commerce, to send news, books, literature – even compliments and criticism – was to show one's commitment to the community as a whole. Given the importance of these exchanges for ensuring the perpetuation of the republic of letters as a community, Lespinasse, Roland, Mosconi, and Renier Michiel worked to reinforce cohesion through friendship and loyalty.  Thus sending a letter or procuring a book was a sign of personal devotion that engendered a social debt to be fulfilled.  In turn, one's ability to fulfill these charges marked one as a good friend and therefore a virtuous member of the Republic of Letters. The fact that both qualities had to overlap explains the practice of recommending one's friends and acquaintances for literary prizes and governmental posts. If women were able to make recommendations that carried weight for both political posts and literary prizes, it was because they were thought capable of evaluating and expressing the values integral to relation in the Republic of Letters. They could judge and produce not only grace and beauty but also friendship and virtue.

By tracing the nature and extent of their participation in intellectual and political debates, it was possible to show the degree to which women's actions diverged not only from conservative gender models but also from their own formulations concerning women's proper social role. Although they often insisted on their own sensibility and lack of critical capacities, the salon women Susan Dalton studied also defined themselves as belonging to the Republic of Letters not only with reference to the very different conception of gender offered by the gens de lettres but also with reference to a wider, gender-neutral vocabulary of personal qualities revered by them even when it contradicted their discourse on gender.

Conduct and community
In 1995, Anne Goldgar published Impolite Learning: Conduct and Community in the Republic of Letters, 1680–1750. Goldgar sees the Republic as a cluster of learned scholars and scientists, whose correspondence and published works (usually in Latin) reveal a community of conservative scholars with preference for substance over style. Lacking any common institutional attachments and finding it difficult to attract aristocratic and courtly patrons, the community created the Republic of Letters to boost morale as much as for any intellectual reason.  Goldgar argues that, in the transitional period between the 17th century and the Enlightenment, the most important common concern by members of the Republic was their own conduct. In the conception of its own members, ideology, religion, political philosophy, scientific strategy, or any other intellectual or philosophical framework were not as important as their own identity as a community

The philosophes, by contrast, represented a new generation of men of letters who were consciously controversial and politically subversive. Moreover, they were urbane popularizers, whose style and lifestyle was much more in tune with the sensibilities of the aristocratic elite who set the tone for the reading public.

Certain broad features can, however, be painted into the picture of the Republic of Letters. The existence of communal standards highlights the first of these: that the scholarly world considered itself to be in some ways separate from the rest of society. Contemporary scholars of the 17th and 18th-centuries felt that, at least in the academic realm, they were not subject to the norms and values of the wider society. Unlike their non-scholarly counterparts, they thought they lived in an essentially egalitarian community, in which all members had equal rights to criticize the work and conduct of others. Moreover, the Republic of Letters in theory ignored distinctions of nationality and religion.

The conventions of the Republic of Letters were a great convenience to scholars throughout Europe.  Scholars in correspondence with each other felt free to ask for assistance in research whenever it was necessary; indeed one of the functions of the commerce de lettres, the purely literary correspondence, was to promote opportunities for research.  Even cities which could in no sense be called isolated, such as Paris or Amsterdam, always lacked certain amenities of scholarship. Many books published in the Netherlands, for example, only found their way to Dutch presses because they were prohibited in France. Manuscripts necessary for research were often in libraries inaccessible to people in other towns. Literary journals usually could not provide enough information with sufficient rapidity to satisfy the needs of most scholars.

The role of intermediary was also prominent in the Republic of Letters. Scholars wrote on behalf of others asking for hospitality, books, and help in research. Often the involvement of an intermediary was a matter of simple convenience.  However, the use of an intermediary frequently had underlying sociological meaning.  A request ending in failure can be both embarrassing and demeaning; refusal to perform a service could mean that the solicited part prefers not to enter into a reciprocal relationship with someone of lower status.

But an intermediary did not merely bear the brunt of refusal; he also contributed to a transaction's success. The ability to use an intermediary indicated that a scholar had at least one contact in the Republic of Letters. This gave proof of his membership in the group, and the intermediary would usually attest to his positive scholarly qualities. In addition, the intermediary usually had wider contacts and consequently higher status within the community.

Although status differences did exist in the Republic of Letters, such differences in fact strengthened rather than weakened the community. The ethos of service, combined with the advantage of gaining status by obliging others, meant that someone of higher ranking was moved to assist his subordinates.  In doing so, he reinforced ties between himself and other scholars. By arranging help for a scholar, he forged or hardened links with the person served, while at the same time reinforcing his reciprocal ties with the final provider of the service.

Intellectual transparency and laicizations
Goodman's approach has found favor with the medical historian Thomas Broman. Building on Habermas, Broman argues that the Enlightenment was a movement of intellectual transparency and laicization. While members of the Republic of Letters lived hermetically sealed from the outside world, talking only to one another, their enlightened successors deliberately placed their ideas before the bar of a nascent public opinion. Broman essentially sees The Republic of Letters as located in the cabinet and the Enlightenment in the market-place.

For most Anglo-American historians, the classic Enlightenment is a forward-looking movement. To these historians, the Republic of Letters are an outdated construction of the 17th century. But in John Pocock's eyes there are two Enlightenments: one, associated with Edward Gibbon, the author of the Decline and Fall of the Roman Empire, which is erudite, serious, and scholarly grounded in the Republic of Letters; the other, the trivial Enlightenment of the Parisian philosophes. The first is a product of a peculiarly English/British and Protestant liberal political and theological tradition and points to the future; the second lacks the anchor of socio-historical analysis and leads unintentionally to Revolutionary mayhem.

In the 1930s, the French historian Paul Hazard homed in on the age of Pierre Bayle and argued that the cumulative effect of the many different and mordant strands of intellectual curiosity in the last quarter of the 17th century created a European cultural crisis, whose negative harvest the philosophes were to reap.  The Republic of Letters and the Enlightenment were insolubly interconnected. Both were movements of criticism.

According to Peter Gay, building on Ernst Cassirer's much earlier study of the intellectual progenitors of Kant, the Enlightenment was the creation of a small group of thinkers, his family of philosophes'' or ‘party of humanity’, whose coherent anti-Christian, ameliorist, and individualistic programme of reform developed from very specific cultural roots. The Enlightenment was not the offspring of the Republic of Letters, let alone the culmination of three centuries of anti-Augustinian critique, but rather the result of the singular marriage of Lucretius and Newton. When a handful of French freethinkers in the second quarter of the 18th century encountered the methodology and achievements of Newtonian science, experimental philosophy and unbelief were mixed together in an explosive cocktail, which gave its imbibers the means to develop a new science of man. Since Gay's work was published, his interpretation of the Enlightenment has become an orthodoxy in the Anglo-Saxon world.

See also

 Coffeehouse
 Daniel Roche
 Dictionnaire philosophique
 Encyclopédie
 English coffeehouses in the 17th and 18th centuries
 Robert Darnton
 Science in the Age of Enlightenment
 Societas eruditorum incognitorum in terris Austriacis

References

Bibliography

.

External links
Mapping the Republic of Letters, Stanford University Humanities Center
Cultures of Knowledge, University of Oxford

Age of Enlightenment